Andrés París is a Colombian guerrilla fighter, member of the FARC-EP and a high-ranking chief of the Eastern Bloc of the FARC-EP. According to El Espectador he is a possible candidate to the FARC's ruling seven member secretariat.

References

Year of birth missing (living people)
Living people
Members of FARC